Redondo Peak is a conspicuous summit in the Jemez Mountains of New Mexico, in the southwestern United States. It is located entirely within the Valles Caldera National Preserve. It is the second highest summit in the Jemez after Chicoma Mountain. It is the most visually prominent peak in the range when viewed from the south, for example, from Albuquerque. From many other directions it is less prominent or not visible, due to its location in the center of the Valles Caldera, well away from the caldera's rim.

Redondo Peak is an example of the volcanic feature known as a resurgent dome. It was formed shortly after the caldera-forming eruption of 1.25 million years ago, but it is not itself an eruptive feature. The summit of the mountain is composed of tuff ejected by the caldera-forming eruption, rather than of subsequent volcanic ejecta.  It is forested all the way to its summit.

Cultural significance

Redondo Peak is sacred to various Pueblo peoples of New Mexico and, as a result, hiking and other recreational activities on the mountain are sharply restricted as of 2008.  The summit area is occupied by a shrine that was studied and excavated by anthropologist William Boone Douglass in the early 20th century and remained in use well into the 20th century.  The shrine and its immediate surroundings are closed to visitors.

References

External links 

 
 

Mountains of New Mexico
Religious places of the indigenous peoples of North America
Landforms of Sandoval County, New Mexico
Mountains of Sandoval County, New Mexico